Robert Domergue (21 November 1921 – 22 January 2014) was French football player and manager.

References

External links 
Profile
Profile

1921 births
2014 deaths
Place of death missing
French footballers
Association football defenders
AS Cannes players
French football managers
French expatriate sportspeople in Monaco
Valenciennes FC managers
Olympique de Marseille managers
AS Monaco FC managers
RC Strasbourg Alsace managers
AS Cannes managers
Espérance Sportive de Tunis managers
Expatriate football managers in Tunisia
Expatriate football managers in Monaco
French expatriate sportspeople in Tunisia
French expatriate football managers
USL Dunkerque managers
Sportspeople from Cannes
Footballers from Provence-Alpes-Côte d'Azur